Robert "Bob" Hill Jackson (born April 8, 1934) is an American photographer. In 1964, Jackson, then working for the Dallas Times Herald, was awarded the Pulitzer Prize for Photography for his photograph of the murder of Lee Harvey Oswald by Jack Ruby.

Early life and career
Born on April 8, 1934, Jackson grew up in Dallas. His interest in photography began when he was 12 or 13. An aunt gave him a Baby Brownie Special camera, and a family cat became one of his first subjects. When Jackson turned 14, his interest became more serious. Another aunt gave him an Argus C-3 35 mm camera. Jackson's first news photo was of a double fatality crash in northern Dallas. Jackson persuaded his father to drive him to the scene of the crash. His second news photo was of an airplane crash at Love Field. Jackson attended Highland Park High School, and later Southern Methodist University, leaving the university in 1957.

His photography interest grew when he began photographing sports car racing. He joined the 36th Infantry National Guard. While in the Army, Jackson became a photographer for an Army general. In August 1960, the Dallas Times Herald hired him.

November 1963
On November 22, 1963, Jackson was assigned to cover President John F. Kennedy's arrival at Love Field and his motorcade through the city. Jackson and many other journalists traveled with the President and first lady from the airport. He was in the eighth vehicle behind the presidential limousine as the motorcade headed down Elm Street. Jackson was sitting atop the back seat of the convertible as the motorcade approached Dealey Plaza. He was in the process of changing film when the shots were fired; but his camera was empty. He had just removed a roll of film to hand-off to another newspaper employee, and had not yet reloaded. However, he was among the few people who thought that they saw a rifle barrel in the window of the book depository. After the assassination, Jackson remained in Dealey Plaza, but took no more photos, something he later regretted.

Two days later, Jackson was told to go to the police station to photograph the transfer of Oswald to the county jail. Using his Nikon S3 35mm camera, Jackson photographed the shooting of Oswald by Jack Ruby in the Dallas police station garage. The photo taken immediately as the shot rang out, shows Oswald impacted by the bullet, his mouth has already opened wide in an anguished expression and his manacled hands clutched at his abdomen, while Dallas police detective Jim Leavelle who was escorting Oswald, reacts. In March 1964, Jackson was called to testify in front of the Warren Commission.

Later life
In later life, Jackson was a staff photographer for the Colorado Springs Gazette-Telegraph. He retired from the Gazette in 1999. He has three daughters, two sons from his wife's previous marriage and a son with his current wife. He also has 10 grandchildren. As of November 2013, Jackson resides in Manitou Springs, Colorado.

In 2021, on the fifty-eighth anniversary of the Kennedy assassination, Jackson said "Every photographer would like to shoot an image that has meaning. I hated to see it happen in Dallas. But I was glad that I was able to cover a moment in history, in time."

References

External links
 Six-tenths of a second, 2 lives forever changed at the Dallas Morning News, January 27, 2004

1934 births
Living people
Artists from Colorado Springs, Colorado
People from Manitou Springs, Colorado
Photographers from Colorado
Place of birth missing (living people)
Pulitzer Prize for Photography winners
Witnesses to the assassination of John F. Kennedy